NHL 2010 may refer to:

NHL 10, video game
2009–10 NHL season
2010–11 NHL season
National Hurling League 2010